Cruft is a jargon word for anything that is left over, redundant and getting in the way.

Cruft may also refer to:

People
 Adrian Cruft (1921–1987), British composer
 Charles Cruft (general) (1826–1883), American teacher, lawyer, railroad executive, and a Union general during the American Civil War
 Charles Cruft (showman) (1852–1938), British showman who founded Crufts dog show
 Eugene Cruft (1887–1976), British double bass player

Other uses
 Cruft (Debian package), a software tool to find cruft in a Linux system

See also
 Crufts, a dog show